Goal of the Season may refer to:

BBC Goal of the Season, English football accolade awarded by the BBC
Goal of the Season (Ireland), Irish football accolade awarded by the Irish media
Premier League Goal of the Season, English football accolade awarded by the Premier League
MLS Goal of the Year Award, American football accolade awarded by the Major League Soccer

See also

Goal of the century
Goal of the Decade
Goal of the Year (disambiguation)
Goal of the Month (disambiguation)